IndieBound is a marketing movement for independent bookstores launched in 2008 by the American Booksellers Association. With resources targeted for "indie" booksellers, it promotes fiscal localism. IndieBound's curated reading lists include the Indie Next List (indie recommendations from around the country) and the Indie Bestseller List (bestsellers lists based on indie store sales).

Launch 
IndieBound was launched in June 2008 to replace a prior marketing program for independents called Book Sense. Independent bookstores sell online through their own e-commerce sites, many using the ABA IndieCommerce platform. IndieBound.org is store referral site for customers searching for an independent bookstore. 

Following its launch, the US scheme was expanded to the UK, New Zealand and Australia. However, as of 2015 the Australian version appears to be in abeyance, as despite still having a Twitter account, the linked website is unrelated and the Australian Booksellers Association website makes no mention of it.

Indie Bestseller Lists 
The Indie Bestseller Lists show the top selling titles in independent bookstores nationwide.

Indie Bestseller Lists are published weekly for hardcover fiction, hardcover nonfiction, trade paperback fiction, trade paperback nonfiction, mass market paperback, "children's interest," children's illustrated, and children's fiction series. Category lists, which focus on a particular genre, are published less frequently. The Indie Bestseller Lists are released by IndieBound as XML feeds.

Indie Next Lists 
Before a major new book is published, the publisher will often send out advance reading copies (ARCs, or uncorrected proofs) to booksellers to generate interest in the book. Owners and employees of ABA member stores review these ARCs, along with brand-new books when they are released, and nominate their favorites as an Indie Next List great read. The American Booksellers Association handles nominations and voting, and releases monthly lists of what member stores have selected. There are special pick lists from time to time.

Indies Choice Book Awards 
Each year, owners and employees of ABA stores have the opportunity to vote for the Indies Choice Book Awards, which is issued in four categories. The winning authors are honored at a banquet at BookExpo America.

References

External links 
IndieBound
Book Sense (archived)
American Booksellers Association

Independent bookstores of the United States
Book publishing in the United States
2008 introductions